Osgood's short-tailed opossum (Monodelphis osgoodi) is a species of opossum in the family Didelphidae. It is found in Bolivia and Peru. Its natural habitats are subtropical or tropical moist lowland forest and subtropical or tropical dry lowland grassland. It is threatened by habitat loss. The opossum is named after American zoologist W. H. Osgood.

References

Opossums
Marsupials of South America
Mammals of Bolivia
Mammals of Peru
Mammals described in 1938
Taxonomy articles created by Polbot